is a Japanese manga series written by Bin Kusamizu and illustrated by Saburō Megumi. It has been serialized in Kodansha's Monthly Afternoon since June 2014. A 10-episode Japanese television drama was broadcast on Fuji Television from January to March 2016.

In 2018, Fragile won the 42nd Kodansha Manga Award in the General category.

Plot
Kēichirō Kishi is an extremely talented pathologist with amazing clinical eye, helped by his vast amount of knowledge, but he is also known as an eccentric and arrogant troublemaker. He uses his diagnostic skills to save patients in secret.

Media

Manga
Fragile is written by Bin Kusamizu and illustrated by Saburō Megumi. The series began in Kodansha's Monthly Afternoon on June 25, 2014. Kodansha has collected its chapters into individual tankōbon volumes. The first volume was released on November 21, 2014. As of September 23, 2022, twenty-three volumes have been released.

Volume list

Drama
The manga was adapted into a Japanese television drama starring Tomoya Nagase as Keiichirō Kishi and Emi Takei as Chihiro Miyazaki. It was directed by Junichi Ishikawa, scripted by Atsuko Hashibe, planning by Hiroaki Narukawa and produced by Hiroshi Kobayashi. The series ran for ten episodes on Fuji Television from January 13 to March 16, 2016.

Reception
Alongside Sanju Mariko, Fragile won the 42nd Kodansha Manga Award in the general category in 2018. It was nominated for the 23rd Tezuka Osamu Cultural Prize in 2019. Fragile was one of the Jury Recommended Works at the 22nd Japan Media Arts Festival in 2019.

References

External links
 
 

Drama anime and manga
Fuji TV original programming
Japanese medical television series
Kodansha manga
Medical anime and manga
Seinen manga
Winner of Kodansha Manga Award (General)